was the 29th Emperor of Japan, according to the traditional order of succession. His reign is said to have spanned the years from 539 to 571. Some historians regard Kinmei as the first historical Japanese Emperor based on historical evidence.

Traditional narrative
Kinmei's contemporary title would not have been tennō, as most historians believe this title was not introduced until the reigns of Emperor Tenmu and Empress Jitō. Rather, it was presumably , meaning "the great king who rules all under heaven".

Events of Kinmei's life
Because of several chronological discrepancies in the account of Emperor Kinmei in the Nihon Shoki, some believe that he was actually ruling a rival court to that of Emperors Ankan and Senka. Nevertheless, according to the traditional account, it was not until the death of Emperor Kinmei's older brother Emperor Senka that he gained the throne.

According to this account, Emperor Senka died in 539 at the age of 73; and succession passed to the third son of Emperor Keitai. This Imperial Prince was the next youngest brother of Emperor Senka. He would come to be known as Emperor Kinmei.

The Emperor's chief counselors were:
 Ōomi (Great Imperial chieftain): Soga no Iname no Sukune, also known as Soga no Iname.
 Ōmuraji (Great Deity chieftain): Monotobe Okoshi no Muraji, also known as Mononobe no Okoshi.
 Ōmuraji (Great Deity chieftain): Ōtomo Kanamura Maro, also known as Otomo no Kanamura.

Although the imperial court was not moved to the Asuka region of Japan until 592, Emperor Kinmei's rule is considered by some to be the beginning of the Asuka period of Yamato Japan, particularly by those who associate the Asuka period primarily with the introduction of Buddhism to Japan from Baekje.

According to the Nihon Shoki, Emperor Kinmei received a bronze statue of Gautama Buddha as a gift from the king of Baekje King Song Myong (聖明王, Seimei Ō) along with a significant envoy of artisans, monks, and other artifacts in 552. (However, according to the Jōgū Shōtoku Hōō Teisetsu, Buddhism was introduced in 538.) This episode is widely regarded as the official introduction of Buddhism to the country.

With the introduction of a new religion to the court, a deep rift developed between the Mononobe clan, whose members supported the worship of Japan's traditional deities, and the Soga clan, whose members supported the adoption of Buddhism.

The Emperor is traditionally venerated at a memorial Shinto shrine (misasagi) at Nara. The Imperial Household Agency designates the Nara location as Kinmei's mausoleum. It is formally named Hinokuma no saki Ai no misasagi. However, the actual sites of the graves of the early Emperors are unclear, according to some historians and archaeologists.

Genealogy
Emperor Kinmei's father was Emperor Keitai and his mother was Emperor Ninken's daughter, . In his lifetime, he was known by the name .

Kinmei had six Consorts and 25 Imperial children (16 sons and 9 daughters). According to Nihongi, he had six wives, but the Kojiki gives only five wives; identifying the third consort to be the same as the sixth one. The first three were his nieces, daughters of his half-brother Emperor Senka; two others were sisters, daughters of the Omi Soga no Iname.

Empress: Ishi-hime (石姫皇女), Emperor Senka's daughter
First son: 
Second son: , later Emperor Bidatsu

Consort: , Emperor Senka's daughter

Consort: , Emperor Senka's daughter
, in the Kojiki as 

Consort: , Soga no Iname's daughter
Fourth Son: , later Prince Shōtoken, adoptive father of Prince Shōtoku
, Saiō; had to resign her charge after being convicted of intrigue with her half-brother Imperial Prince Mubaragi
, also 
, later Empress Dowager Kitano-Hime, married to Emperor Bidatsu
, also 

, also 
, married to her nephew, Prince Oshisako no Hikohito no Oe, Emperor Bidatsu's son
Sixth Son: , also 
, also 

, also , married to her nephew, Prince Maroko, Emperor Yōmei's son
Emperor Yōmei (用明天皇)

Consort: , Soga no Iname's daughter
, also 

Third daughter: , married to her half brother, Emperor Yōmei, later married to her nephew and stepson, Prince Tame (Emperor Yōmei's son)

, later Kimiyori no Kimitsuhi
, speculated as Emperor Senka's son

Consort: , Kasuga no Hifuri no Omi's daughter

, also

Ancestry

See also
 The civil war of the Keitai and Kinmei dynasties
 Emperor of Japan
 List of Emperors of Japan
 Imperial cult

Notes

References
 Aston, William George. (1896).  Nihongi: Chronicles of Japan from the Earliest Times to A.D. 697. London: Kegan Paul, Trench, Trubner.  
 Brown, Delmer M. and Ichirō Ishida, eds. (1979).  Gukanshō: The Future and the Past. Berkeley: University of California Press. ;  
 Ponsonby-Fane, Richard Arthur Brabazon. (1959).  The Imperial House of Japan. Kyoto: Ponsonby Memorial Society. 
 Titsingh, Isaac. (1834). Nihon Ōdai Ichiran; ou,  Annales des empereurs du Japon.  Paris: Royal Asiatic Society, Oriental Translation Fund of Great Britain and Ireland.  
 Varley, H. Paul. (1980). Jinnō Shōtōki: A Chronicle of Gods and Sovereigns. New York: Columbia University Press. ;  

 
 

509 births
571 deaths
6th-century monarchs in Asia
6th-century Japanese monarchs
Japanese emperors
People of Asuka-period Japan
Buddhism in the Asuka period